The following is a list of mountain passes and gaps in the Commonwealth of the Northern Mariana Islands.

See also

References

External links

Mountain passes